Alec Clarey (born 8 February 1994) is an English rugby union player who plays for Saracens in the RFU Championship. 

After graduating from Barnard Castle School, he moved to Hartpury College on a scholarship whilst previously represented England Students, where he helped Hartpury win the National League 1 Championship during the 2016-17 season, thus promoted to the RFU Championship next season. He was also a part of Bristol academy system, where he was featured in their Aviva 'A' League competition, whilst playing for Hartpury. 

On 27 April 2017, Clarey signed his first professional contract with Jersey Reds to stay in the RFU Championship from the 2017-18 season.  On 30 June 2020, Carey has left Jersey to signed for Saracens from the 2020-21 season.

References

External links
Its Rugby Profile

1994 births
Living people
Alumni of Hartpury College
Bristol Bears players
English rugby union players
Jersey Reds players
People educated at Barnard Castle School
Rugby union players from Bishop Auckland
Rugby union props
Saracens F.C. players